The 2011 Skycity Triple Crown was a motor race for the Australian sedan-based V8 Supercars racing cars. It was the sixth event of the 2011 International V8 Supercars Championship. It was held on the weekend of June 17 to 19 at Hidden Valley Raceway in Darwin, Northern Territory. It was the fourteenth V8 Supercar event held at the circuit.

The event hosted races 12 and 13 of the 2011 season. A 42 lap, 120-kilometre race was held on Saturday while Sunday saw a 69 lap, 200-kilometre race. Qualifying for Race 12 consisted of a 20-minute, all-in session with the fastest ten progressing to the top ten shootout. Qualifying for Race 13 was a single 20 minute, all-in session.

Ford Performance Racing's Mark Winterbottom took his second consecutive pole position in qualifying for Race 12 after taking pole for the Sunday race at Winton. He was followed by the Triple Eight Race Engineering Holden of championship leader Jamie Whincup and Shane van Gisbergen of Stone Brothers Racing. These three drivers remained untroubled at the front for the majority of the race until the final safety car restart. Whincup tapped the back of Winterbottom and in response, Winterbottom slowed. This backed the field up and Winterbottom, Whincup and Van Gisbergen raced down the main straight three abreast. Towards the end of the straight, Garry Rogers Motorsport driver Lee Holdsworth pulled out of the slipstream of the top three and made it four-wide into turn one. Winterbottom and Whincup made contact which sent Whincup and Van Gisbergen off onto the grass and Winterbottom then made contact with Holdsworth before spinning in the middle of turn one and being hit by Karl Reindler. Kelly Racing's Rick Kelly emerged in the lead followed by Holdsworth, Steven Johnson and Craig Lowndes. Kelly went on to win the race, his second of the season, from Johnson and Lowndes, with Holdsworth slipping back to fourth with damaged steering. After being the top three for most of the race, Winterbottom, Whincup and Van Gisbergen finished fifteenth, ninth and seventh respectively, with each driver being penalised 25 championship points for their involvement in the incident.

Drivers in the midfield also had their dramas. Rod Nash Racing driver Paul Dumbrell went off at turn five on lap one, rejoining in the lead at turn seven. Dumbrell readdressed his position on the main straight and a penalty was not applied, causing controversy amongst the field. Jason Bright, winner for Brad Jones Racing on Sunday at Winton, experienced a puncture after contact with Tony D'Alberto and was hit by David Reynolds as he attempted to limp back to the pit lane. The collision put both drivers out of the race. Garth Tander was given a penalty after he left his Holden Racing Team pit bay with the air hose still attached and dragged it along the pit lane.

Winterbottom and Whincup again filled the front row for Race 13, with Lowndes and Holdsworth on row two. Holdsworth, one of the only drivers on the softer tyre, led into turn one while Whincup, also on the soft tyre, bogged it down and dropped to the back of the top ten. Jason Bright again failed to finish when his engine failed at the end of the main straight, causing him to spin off the track. Reigning champion James Courtney, Karl Reindler and Rick Kelly went off on Bright's oil. Whincup and Holdsworth were first and second until late in the race, courtesy of using the soft tyre early on. Lowndes passed Holdsworth, five seconds behind Whincup, on lap 58 and on the same lap Reindler spun off the track and into the wall at turn eleven. The safety car was deployed, reducing Whincup's lead to nothing. Lowndes overtook Whincup on the restart and Whincup and Holdsworth began to slide down the order on hard tyres with the other drivers on soft tyres. Van Gisbergen caught and passed Lowndes with two laps remaining and held on to take his second win of the season.

With Lowndes finishing ahead of Whincup in both races and Whincup's 25-point penalty, the gap between the Triple Eight team mates in the championship decreased from 262 points to 156. Van Gisbergen remained in third place, 261 points behind Whincup. Following the event, Lowndes was fined $10,000 for performing a burnout at the entry to the podium area.

Results
Results as follows:

Qualifying Race 12
Qualifying timesheet:

 - Paul Dumbrell ran off the road at turn one on his shootout lap and opted not to complete the lap.

Race 12
Race timesheets:

Qualifying Race 13
Qualifying timesheet:

Race 13
Race timesheets:

Standings
 After 13 of 28 races.

References

Darwin
Sport in Darwin, Northern Territory
2010s in the Northern Territory
Motorsport in the Northern Territory